Swimming, for the 2019 Island Games, held at the Lathbury Sports Complex, Gibraltar in July 2019. The events were held in a short course (25 m) pool.

Medal table

Results

Men

Women

Mixed 

 Swimmers who participated only in the heats and received medals.

References 

2019 Island Games
2019
Island Games